is the 23rd single by Japanese singer/songwriter Chisato Moritaka. The lyrics were written by Moritaka and the music was composed by Hideo Saitō. The single was released by One Up Music on May 10, 1994. The song was used as the ending theme of TV Tokyo's variety show Asakusabashi Young Yōhinten.

Chart performance 
"Natsu no Hi" peaked at No. 5 on Oricon's singles chart and sold 409,000 copies. It was also certified Platinum by the RIAJ.

Other versions 
Moritaka re-recorded the song and uploaded the video on her YouTube channel on August 10, 2012. This version is also included in Moritaka's 2012 self-covers DVD album Love Vol. 1.

Track listing 
All lyrics are written by Chisato Moritaka; all music is composed and arranged by Hideo Saitō.

Personnel 
 Chisato Moritaka – vocals, drums
 Hideo Saitō – guitar, bass, keyboard, tambourine, backing vocals

Chart positions

Certification

Cover versions 
 Something Else covered the song on their 2004 album Natsu Uta.

References

External links 
 
 
 

1994 singles
1994 songs
Japanese-language songs
Chisato Moritaka songs
Songs with lyrics by Chisato Moritaka
Songs with music by Hideo Saitō (musician, born 1958)
One Up Music singles